Carex utriculata is a species of sedge known as Northwest Territory sedge and common yellow lake sedge.

Distribution
This sedge is native to the northern half of North America, including most all of Canada and the northern United States, and down to montane California. It is also found in northern Europe and northern Asia. It is a common plant in many types of wetland habitat.

Description
Carex utriculata produces stems exceeding  in maximum height from a thick network of long rhizomes. Each inflorescence bears up to 200 developing fruits, each enclosed in a shiny green, golden, or brown perigynium.

References

External links
Jepson Manual Treatment - Carex utriculata
Carex utriculata - Photo gallery

utriculata
Flora of Canada
Flora of the United States
Flora of Europe
Flora of Asia
Flora of the Sierra Nevada (United States)
Plants described in 1839
Flora without expected TNC conservation status